The William S. Gerity House is a historic house located at 415 William Street in Elmira, Chemung County, New York.

Description and history 
Known in upstate New York as "The Strawberry Mansion" (for its distinct red brick facade), this historic home was built in about 1880 and designed by Thomas Gerity, a well-known regional architect of the day.  A large two-story, brick and stone Queen Anne style dwelling of almost 8,000 square feet, the home showcases classic wood moldings, 12 foot etched ceilings, and original pocket doors. It features an irregular cross-gabled massing and high gable roofs, as well as a large bracketed entrance porch, second story balcony, and projected semi-octagonal front bay.

It was listed on the National Register of Historic Places on February 22, 2010. Originally designed as a private residence, "The Strawberry Mansion" was purchased in December 2019 by Charlie Schmitt and Brenda Brown, who are restoring it to its Victorian period grandeur for use as a private residence and vacation rental.

References

Queen Anne architecture in New York (state)
Houses completed in 1880
Houses on the National Register of Historic Places in New York (state)
Houses in Chemung County, New York
Buildings and structures in Elmira, New York
National Register of Historic Places in Chemung County, New York